is a 2014 Japanese romance film directed by Naoto Kumazawa and an adaptation of the manga series of the same name.

Plot
Kururugi Yuni (Nana Komatsu) is a high school prodigy who has a difficult time expressing herself. And whilst having top grades in all her subjects, she isn't doing so well in English and so her English class teacher, Haruka Sakurai (Tomohisa Yamashita) gives her temporary private one on one English lessons.

But when the guardian of Yuni who is also the schools maths teacher, Kazuma Akechi (Arai Hirofumi), notices the differences in Yuni's behaviour, he decideds to put a stop to the tutoring.

With the encouragement of her only friend, Nanami Kikuko (Mizuki Yamamoto), Yuni realises that she has fallen in love with her teacher, Sakurai who also happens to be admired by every girl in school. Every time Yuni has the chance to express the way she feels to Sakurai, she isn't able to do so.

But finally, Yuni musters up the courage to confess to her teacher and tries to do so by using a notebook that reads "I hate you teacher but I also like you. What should I do?" while hiding under his desk in class. Sakurai sees her and purposely drops a pen. While bending down to pick the pen, he leans towards her before kissing her.

Trying to keep it a secret, Sakurai doesn't know that the new homeroom teacher of Yuni's class, Mirei Takizawa (Asami Mizukawa), who is being shown around, coincidentally sees the incident between them.

When a co-teacher introduces Mirei to Sakurai, Sakurai is surprised to see his childhood friend again. Mirei tells Sakurai what she saw and that she still has feelings for him. But things develop further between Yuni and Sakurai when Mirei tries to stop their relationship by taking a photo of Sakurai and Yuni hugging each other as she passes them. Mirei shows the photo to Akechi when he asks for Mirei's help to keep an eye on her as he is concerned about her strange behavior which leads to Akechi confronting Sakurai and asking him to leave Yuni as she has given up her dreams of going to her dream college for Sakurai. Akechi asks Sakurai to encourage her to study abroad which he is reluctant to do but does out of care for Yuni.

Heartbroken when Sakurai cuts ties between the two of them, Yuni decides to follow her dreams. However she is unable to forget him after leaving to study at the University of California and she soon returns to Japan to confront him again. The two of them finally reconcile at the beach where they had their first date.

Cast
 Tomohisa Yamashita as Haruka Sakurai
 Nana Komatsu as Yuni Kururugi
 Asami Mizukawa as Mirei Takizawa
 Nozomu Kotaki as Ryu Matoba
 Mizuki Yamamoto as Kikuko Nanami
 Hirofumi Arai as Kazuma Akechi
 Kazuma Sano as Saki Sato
 Seika Furuhata as Mei Yoshida

Development
The trailer and poster for the film were released on October 6, 2014. Japanese band Sakanaction performed the film's theme song, "Hasu no Hana".

Reception
Close Range Love grossed US$9,812,922 at the Japanese box office. It also held the number one spot in the Japanese box office for three weeks.

References

External links
 

2010s Japanese films
2010s Japanese-language films
2014 romance films
Films about scandalous teacher–student relationships
Live-action films based on manga
Japanese romance films